Umzingwane is a district in the northern part of Matabeleland South province in Zimbabwe. It was formerly known as Esigodini  and before 1982 as Essexvale.

Its governing seat is located in the village of Umzingwane.

Geography
Umzingwane District adjacent to Bulawayo on the northwest, and the north to Umguza District of Matabeleland North. Otherwise, it is bounded by districts of Matabeleland South, namely Mguza to the northeast, Insiza to the east, Gwanda to the south, and Matobo to the west. it is found along Gwanda road

Places in Umzingwane
 Bezha, a village, birthplace of Professor Thomas Dube, academic and lawyer who served as senior legal and political affairs advisor for 19 years at     United Nations Security Council.   
 Bushtick, a village
 Bushtick Mine
 Esibomvu, a village
 Esigodini, administrative centre
 Esiphezini, birthplace of Canaan Banana, first president of Zimbabwe
 Inyankuni reservoir
 Kumbuzi, a village
 Lake Cunningham Recreational Park, 41.72 km2
 Matendele, a village
 Mawabeni, a village
 Mzingwane Dam reservoir
 Mzingwane River (Umzingwane River)
 Nswazi, a village
 Selous House Homestake, historical site
 Sihlengeni, a village
 Umzingwane Recreational Park, 12 km2
 Upper and Lower Ncema reservoirs

Administration and politics
Umzingwane District has government headquarters located in the village of Umzingwane, and by the Umzingwane Rural District Council, which has its offices in Esigodini. Traditionally the district is divided into four parts, each ruled by a local chieftain.
 Esiphezini Communal Land tribal area
 uMzinyathini Communal Land
 Nswazi Communal Land
 Matopo Communal Land

Economy
In 2012, Umzingwane District had 48 percent of the economically active population employed in agriculture (primarily livestock raising), 17 percent employed in services occupations, 17 percent employed in mining and construction and 2 percent employed in educational institutions.

Notes and references

External links
 

Districts of Matabeleland South Province